Swamp iris is a common name for several plants and may refer to:

Patersonia fragilis, native to southeastern Australia
Iris ser. Hexagonae, a group of Iris species native to North America, also known as "Louisiana iris"